Sand pagodas (also known as sand stupas), are temporary pagodas or stupas erected from mud or sand as a means of cultivating Buddhist merit. The practice is common to Theravada Buddhists throughout mainland Southeast Asia, primarily in Myanmar (Burma) and Thailand.

History 
The earliest extant reference to the sand pagoda building tradition is in Burmese literary works, namely a pyo verse poem composed by Shin Maha Silavamsa during the Kingdom of Ava (c. 1500s). By contrast, Burmese oral tradition attributes the custom of building sand pagodas to the arrival of Ayutthayan royals, advisors and their retinue in the Konbaung Kingdom, which occurred two centuries later, following the fall of Ayutthaya in the Burmese–Siamese War (1765–1767). The custom was practiced throughout the kingdom in pre-colonial Burma, including by the royal court.

Regional celebrations

Myanmar 
During Māgha Pūjā, known as the Full Moon Day of Tabaung, Burmese devotees in Upper Myanmar construct sand pagodas in honor of the Buddha. The festivities are collectively called sand pagoda festivals (သဲပုံစေတီပွဲ). The Rakhine people also build sand pagodas during this season, in a festival called Shaikthaunghmyauk festival (သျှစ်သောင်းမြှောက်ပွဲ), held on the seabanks of cities like Sittwe. Mandalay holds two major sand pagoda festivals, at the Mont Tisu and Maha Walaku Pagodas. 

Burmese sand pagodas are typically of graduated five tiers, tapering to the top, with each tier flanked by bamboo masts. The five tiers represent five layers of Mount Meru, the legendary peak of Buddhist cosmology. Devotees offer fruits, flowers and other offerings, and circumambulate the sand pagoda thrice before paying homage. On the full moon day of Tabaung, the sand pagoda's umbrella crown or hti is removed.

In 1961, Burmese president U Nu performed a yadaya ritual to avert disaster in the country, by ordering the construction of 70,000 sand pagodas.

Thailand 

In Northern Thailand, sand pagodas are constructed during Songkran.

See also 

 Buddhism in Burma
 Burmese pagoda
 Cetiya
 Māgha Pūjā
 Pagoda festival
 Stupa
 Vessantara Festival

References 

Pagodas in Myanmar